Goran Ivanišević was the defending champion but lost in the final 7–5, 7–6(7–3) against Thomas Muster.

Seeds
A champion seed is indicated in bold text while text in italics indicates the round in which that seed was eliminated.

  Goran Ivanišević (final)
  Thomas Muster (champion)
  Richard Krajicek (quarterfinals)
  Wayne Ferreira (quarterfinals)
  Carlos Moyá (first round)
  Albert Costa (second round)
  Boris Becker (quarterfinals)
  Félix Mantilla (first round)

Draw

References
 1997 Dubai Tennis Championships Draw

1997 Dubai Tennis Championships
Singles